Otto Axel Risum (February 24, 1835 – March 11, 1924) was an American farmer, merchant, and politician.

Biography
Born in Christiana, Norway, Risum emigrated to the United States in 1856 and eventually settled in Rock County, Wisconsin. Risum served in the 15th Wisconsin Volunteer Regiment during the American Civil War. In 1873, Risum settled in Pulcifer, Shawano County, Wisconsin in the town of Green Valley. He was a farmer and merchant. Risum served as chairman of the Green Valley town board and was a Republican. In 1897, Risum served in the Wisconsin State Assembly. Risum moved to Sawtelle, California to live in a warmer climate; he died there and was buried at the Los Angeles National Cemetery.

Notes

External links
Otto Axel Risum, Rootsweb.ancestry.com

1835 births
1924 deaths
Norwegian emigrants to the United States
People from Shawano County, Wisconsin
People of Wisconsin in the American Civil War
Union Army soldiers
Businesspeople from Wisconsin
Farmers from Wisconsin
Mayors of places in Wisconsin
Republican Party members of the Wisconsin State Assembly